Stilling is a surname. Notable people with the surname include:

Benedict Stilling (1810–1879), German anatomist and surgeon
Harald Conrad Stilling (1815–1891), Danish architect
Jakob Stilling (1842–1915), German ophthalmologist

See also
Viggo Stilling-Andersen (1893–1967), Danish fencer
Stillings
Global terrestrial stilling